The discography of The Rocket Summer, the rock solo project of Stephen Bryce Avary, consists of seven studio albums, five EPs, one compilation album, one live album and twenty-three singles.

Albums

Studio albums

Live albums

Extended plays

Singles

Compilation appearances

Videography

Music videos

References

Discographies of American artists